The straighthead soldierfish (Ostichthys archiepiscopus) is a soldierfish species belonging to the family Holocentridae.

It is found in the Indian Ocean, near Mozambique, Réunion and Mauritius, and in the Pacific Ocean, near the Ryukyu Islands, Hawaii, Tahiti, and Mo'orea.

References

External links

Ostichthys
Fish of the Indian Ocean
Fish of the Pacific Ocean
Fish described in 1862
Least concern biota of Asia
Least concern biota of Oceania